Sidhartha Vijay Mallya (born May 7, 1987) is an Indian national. He registered with the Screen Actors Guild as Sid Mallya, saying he chose the stage name to try to avoid being typecast in stereotypical roles. He appeared in a sex comedy film entitled Brahman Naman. He has also hosted an online video show, appeared as a guest judge and host on the Kingfisher Calendar Girl selection show, and worked as a model.

Mallya is the son of Indian businessman Vijay Mallya, the former chairman of UB Group (an Indian conglomerate that is primarily in the alcoholic beverages business), and the grandson of Vittal Mallya, who was the company's previous chairman.

He also worked as director of the IPL cricket team Royal Challengers Bangalore (RCB), which was owned by his father at the time, and as a marketing manager for Guinness (a product of Diageo, a large drinks company closely tied to his father's business). In 2010 he also became one of the directors of the football club Mohun Bagan when his father stepped down as director. He is certainly part of his family trust wealth which gets him lots of money every year. He is owner of several shell firms and offshore trusts that helps him earn money.

Early life and education 
Siddharth Mallya was born in Los Angeles, California, to Indian businessman Vijay Mallya and former airline hostess Samira Mallya (née Tyabjee). His father is of a Konkani background. Shortly after Siddharth's birth, the family moved to England, where he was primarily raised. The family also lived part of the time in Dubai (in the United Arab Emirates). At the age of 15, he started boarding school at Papplewick School in Ascot and then went to Wellington College, Berkshire, where he passed his GCSEs and A Levels. He then attended Queen Mary University of London, where he obtained a bachelor's degree in business management. While at the university, he also played on its field hockey team.

In 2016, he was awarded a diploma supplement for a Master of Arts degree in Acting for Screen from the Royal Central School of Speech and Drama of the  University of London.

Career 

After graduating from university, Mallya spent a year working for drinks giant Diageo, as an assistant brand manager on Guinness.

At the beginning of 2010, he became director of the Royal Challengers Bangalore (RCB) IPL cricket team, which is owned by UB Group (his father's company). While he was at the RCB, he oversaw the team's "Green Initiatives", which led to RCB claiming to be the world's first carbon-neutral sports team through fan engagement. In 2012, he launched an online chat show called No Boundaries. The show was written and hosted by him, and its episodes were posted on the team's web site. The website show primarily featured players from the RCB cricket team.

Later that year, he appeared as the lead presenter and judge on "The Hunt for The Kingfisher Calendar Girl 2013" on the NDTV Good Times channel. He made his ramp modeling debut during Lakme Fashion Week 2012 as the show stopper for designer Komal Sood. He followed this up by walking for designers Shantanu and Nikhil during Indian Bridal Week.

In the latter half of 2013, Mallya was selected as one of 20 to participate in the ABC Talent Showcase, a platform and training program for aspiring talents, out of more than 7000 applicants. In 2014, he launched a YouTube show called Sid Sessions.

Mallya made his feature film debut in the sex comedy film Brahman Naman directed by Q and produced by Steve Barron where he played Ronnie, a cricket-playing jock, who is rich, good-looking, and popular with girls.

Television and web appearances

Filmography

Awards and accolades 
Hello! India Hall of Fame Awards Celebutante of the year 2010
Rotary Vocational Excellence Award 2010
GQ Men of The Year Awards – Most stylish man in India 2011
Power Brands Hall of Fame Awards (for work on RCB) 2011
HT Café Mumbai's Most Stylish Awards 2011
Top 5 of India's Sexiest Bachelor show on Big CBS Prime 2011
Panasonic Green Globe Foundation Awards special honour 2012
Ivy Sports Symposium "10 Next" of the next generation of sports industry leaders 2012

Personal life 

Mallya is a running enthusiast, having taken part in two Mumbai Marathons, the London Marathon and the Delhi Half Marathon.

References

External links 
 
 

1987 births
Living people
People from Los Angeles
American people of Indian descent
American people of Kannada descent
United Breweries Group
People educated at Papplewick School
People educated at Wellington College, Berkshire
Alumni of Queen Mary University of London